Henri-Charles Bois (February 8, 1897 – July 18, 1962) was an agronomist and Canadian Senator.

He was born in St-Joseph de Lévis, Quebec, the son of Napoleon Bois and Lumina Belanger. He was a professor at the Institut Agricole d'Oka and founded the Corporation d'agronomie de Quebec.

He was appointed to the Senate by Louis St. Laurent as a Liberal on January 3, 1957, and represented the Senate division of Montarville, Quebec, until his death in 1962.

References

External links

1897 births
1962 deaths
Canadian senators from Quebec
Liberal Party of Canada senators